Yannick Buffet (born December 23, 1979) is a French ski mountaineer.

Buffet was born in La Rivière-Enverse. He is member of the Praz Montagne and has been member of the French national selection since 2007. He lives in Praz sur Arly.

Selected results 
 2007:
 3rd, European Championship relay race (together with Bertrand Blanc, Tony Sbalbi and Fabien Anselmet)
 7th, European Championship team race (together with Bertrand Blanc)
 2008:
 6th, World Championship
 9th (and 7th in the "international men" ranking), Patrouille des Glaciers (together with Philippe Blanc and Martial Premat)
 2009:
 1st, European Championship single race
 1st, European Championship combination ranking
 3rd, European Championship vertical race
 3rd, Dachstein Xtreme
 4th, European Championship team race (together with Grégory Gachet)
 2011:
 2nd, World Championship vertical race
 3rd, World Championship single race
 3rd, World Championship relay, together with Didier Blanc, Xavier Gachet and William Bon Mardion
 4th, World Championship vertical, combined ranking
 2012:
 2nd, European Championship vertical race
 2nd, European Championship team, together with Mathéo Jacquemoud
 2nd, European Championship relay, together with Alexis Sévennec-Verdier, Valentin Favre and William Bon Mardion
 7th, World Championship vertical, combined ranking

Pierra Menta 

 2009: 3rd, together with Florent Perrier
 2012: 6th, together with Yannick Ecoeur

External links 
 Yannick Buffet at skimountaineering.org

References 

1979 births
Living people
French male ski mountaineers
Sportspeople from Haute-Savoie